Messier 103 (also known as M103, or NGC 581) is an open cluster where a few hundred, mainly very faint, stars figure in Cassiopeia. It was discovered in 1781 by Charles Messier's friend and collaborator Pierre Méchain.<ref name=TTGNet>Robert Bruce Thompson  , M103 (open cluster in Cassiopeia). Accessed online 13 April 2011</ref> It is located between 8,000 to 9,500 light-years from the Solar System and ranging over about 15 light years. It holds about 40 certain-member stars, two of which have magnitudes 10.5, and a 10.8 red giant, which is the brightest within the cluster. A bright known foreground object is the star Struve 131, not a member of the cluster. The cluster may have 172 stars if including those down to 50% probability of a gravitational tie. M103 is about 22 million years old.

Observation history
After the discovery of Messier 101 through 103, Messier had no cause to carry out more detailed observations of these clusters and included them as an addition to his catalogue using the data of Méchain. In 1783, William Herschel observed M103 and described the region as 14 to 16 pL (pretty large stars) and with great many eS'' or extremely faint ones.  Åke Wallenquist then identified 40 stars in M103 while Antonín Bečvář raised the number to 60. Archinal and Hynes then determined that the cluster had 172 stars. Admiral William Henry Smyth was the first to see the 10.8-magnitude red giant, citing the double star on Cassiopeia's knee, about a degree to the northeast of Delta Cassiopeiae (Ruchbah/Rukhbah).

Observing with binoculars
Messier 103 has been rated by the Astronomical League as an easy object to find and the cluster is visible even with the use of binoculars. M103 can be seen as a nebulous fan-shaped patch, and takes up about a 6 arcminute′ circle (a tenth of a degree), about a fifth the apparent diameter of the moon. To find M103, it is suggested that the observer center their binoculars on Ruchbah or the bottom left (or right against a northern horizon, as it more often is from Earth) star of the signature “W” asterism of Cassiopeia.

Gallery

See also
 List of Messier objects

References and footnotes

External links

Open Cluster M103 @ SEDS Messier pages
Open Cluster M103 @ Skyhound.com

Open clusters
Cassiopeia (constellation)
103
Messier 103
178104??
Perseus Arm
Discoveries by Pierre Méchain